The Olympic Council of Asia (OCA) received two bids to host the 2010 Asian Games from Guangzhou, China and Kuala Lumpur, Malaysia. Later in the bidding process, Kuala Lumpur withdrew their bid, leaving Guangzhou as the sole bidder. Guangzhou was elected as the host city on 1 July 2004.

Bidding process 

 Submission of letters of intent (20 December 2003)
 Deadline for the submission of bids (31 March 2004)
 OCA Evaluation Committee visit to Kuala Lumpur (12–13 April 2004)
 OCA Evaluation Committee visit to Guangzhou (14–16 April 2004)
 Election of the host city during the 23rd OCA General Assembly at The Ritz-Carlton Hotel in Doha, Qatar (1 July 2004)

Candidate cities

Showed preliminary interest 
Two cities expressed interest in bidding and submitted letter of intent, but failed to submit bids when applications were due.
  Amman, Jordan
  Seoul, South Korea - Withdrew after considering that South Korea hosted the 2002 Games in Busan only eight years earlier.

References 

2010 Asian Games
Asian Games bids
2004 in Qatar
July 2004 events in Asia